Van Ostrand is a surname. Notable people with the surname include:

Jimmy Van Ostrand (born 1984), Canadian baseball player
Maggie Van Ostrand, American humorist and journalist

Surnames of Dutch origin